The Tyronza Methodist Episcopal Church, South is a historic church building at 129 Church Street in Tyronza, Arkansas.  It is a single-story masonry structure, built out of orange brick laid on a raised basement.  Its main facade, facing west, has a projecting vestibule with shallow-pitch roofline matching that of the main roof, and is approached by a broad and shallow flight of stairs.  Windows on this facade are narrow, with rounded-arch tops, while other windows on the building are either arched or rectangular sash.  The church was built in 1928, and is a good local example of Classical Revival design.  Its architect is unknown;  its design resembles that of the Wabbaseka Methodist Episcopal Church, South.

The church was listed on the National Register of Historic Places in 2015.

See also
National Register of Historic Places listings in Poinsett County, Arkansas

References

Churches on the National Register of Historic Places in Arkansas
Neoclassical architecture in Arkansas
Buildings and structures in Poinsett County, Arkansas
National Register of Historic Places in Poinsett County, Arkansas
Neoclassical church buildings in the United States